Pisolithus arhizus  is a widespread earth-ball like fungus, which may in fact be several closely related species. Common names include dead man's foot and dyeball.  It is known in Australia as the horse dung fungus, in South Africa as perdebal, and in Europe as the Bohemian truffle.  This puffball's black viscous gel is used as a natural dye for clothes.  Pisolithus arhizus is a major component in mycorrhizal fungus mixtures that are used in gardening as powerful root stimulators. It is inedible.

The fruiting body is 5–30 cm tall and 4–20 cm wide, with a thin yellow-brown to brown exterior layer. The spores are brown.

Dictyocephalos attenuatus is similar.

References

External links

Pisolithus tinctorius
Mushroomexpert.com

Boletales
Fungi described in 1786
Inedible fungi